Yoandry Hernández Coba (born May 25, 1980, in Las Tunas) is a male weightlifter from Cuba. He won a gold medal at the 2007 Pan American Games for his native Caribbean country. Hernández represented Cuba at the 2008 Summer Olympics in Beijing, PR China.

References
 sports-reference

1980 births
Living people
Cuban male weightlifters
Olympic weightlifters of Cuba
Weightlifters at the 2003 Pan American Games
Weightlifters at the 2007 Pan American Games
Weightlifters at the 2004 Summer Olympics
Weightlifters at the 2008 Summer Olympics
People from Las Tunas (city)
Pan American Games gold medalists for Cuba
Pan American Games silver medalists for Cuba
Pan American Games medalists in weightlifting
Central American and Caribbean Games gold medalists for Cuba
Competitors at the 2006 Central American and Caribbean Games
Central American and Caribbean Games medalists in weightlifting
Medalists at the 2007 Pan American Games
Olympic medalists in weightlifting
Olympic bronze medalists for Cuba
Medalists at the 2008 Summer Olympics
Pan American Weightlifting Championships medalists
20th-century Cuban people
21st-century Cuban people